Gold Coins is a 2017 Malayalam feature film written and directed by Pramod G Gopal, and starring Dr Amar Ramachandran, Master Vasudev, Master Gopal, Sunny Wayne, Meera Nandan, and Tessa Joseph in the lead role. The film is a Neni Entertainments production and was released on 9 June 2017.

Cast
 Dr. Amar Ramachandran as Dineshan
 Master Vasudev as Kichu
 Master Gopal as Achu
 Sunny Wayne as Katha
 Meera Nandan as Smriti Teacher
 Tessa Joseph as Sujatha
 Sai Kumar as Headmaster Lucko mash 
 Hemanth Menon as Nihal
 Anil Nedumangad as Nazeer
 Raja Sahib as Charlie
 Sujith Sankar as Avanbhai
 Appunni sasi as Anandan
 Joy Mathew as Bride father
 Saju Navodaya as Guide Gopan
 Master Adish Praveen as Rocket
 Master Rahul as Milma
 Master Abin as Thurumbu
 Master Aakash as Bottle
 Annop Chandran as announcer
 Jelbi Anna Augustine as Laya
 Baby Neha Amar as Nandana
 Baby Devaprabha as Anna
 Baby Aanmary as Aanmary
 Master Laxman as Pauly
 Nandan as Salman
 Aaron as Roney
 Saju kodiyan as Auto driver Radhamani
 Munshi Venu as Hotel owner
 Purushu Kottayam as Dineshan Boss
 Majeed as Cycle shop owner
 Kunjikka as Koya mash
 Biju kodungallur as Toddy man
 Vinod kedamangangalam as Antony
 Dr.Justine as Gopi
 Shyam as Paraman
 Vishnu as Syed
 Boney as Chain hacker
 Akhil as democracy
 Saji as Bhagavan
 Satheesh chevayur as Giri
 Jose.P.Raphel as Tamil sales man

Songs 
 illillam (pathos) : P.Jayachandran
 illillam : K.S. Harisankar, Sneha Johnson, Albin Nelson...
 Hridhaya deepam : Baby Shreya

Release 
Initially the film was released 9 June 2017. Currently Movie is streaming on Saina Play - a Malayalam OTT Platform From 16 July 2021.

References

External links 
 

2010s Malayalam-language films
Films scored by Ouseppachan